Endotricha nigra is a species of snout moth in the genus Endotricha. It was described by Wang and Li, in 2005, and is known from China (Fujian, Guizhou).

The wingspan is 21–23 mm. The forewings are dark black suffused with mauve scales and the costal margin is dotted with white along edge. The hindwing color and pattern are the same as the forewings, but the antemedial line is white and inconspicuous and the postmedial line is black.

Etymology
The specific name is derived from the Latin niger (meaning black) and refers to the wing color.

References

Moths described in 2005
Endotrichini